Senegalia lowei, also commonly known as feathery acacia, is a plant native to Brazil, which is also called unha de gato, Portuguese for "cat's claw".

References

lowei
Flora of Brazil